Francis Steward "Cal" Hockley (March 21, 1931 – December 10, 2020)  was a Canadian ice hockey player with the Trail Smoke Eaters. He was the captain of the gold medal winning team at the 1961 World Ice Hockey Championships in Switzerland.

References

1931 births
2020 deaths
Ice hockey people from British Columbia
Canadian ice hockey centres
People from Fernie, British Columbia